WKMJ-FM (93.5 FM) is a radio station broadcasting a hot adult contemporary format, licensed to Hancock, Michigan.

Mix 93 airs Westwood One's Hot AC format with a local morning drive show during the day on weekdays. Mix93 is also the exclusive radio voice of the Michigan Tech Huskies, covering all home and away hockey, football, and basketball games, as well as select volleyball games. Dirk Hembroff currently serves as the "Voice of the Huskies," and is in his seventh year as the radio play-by-play commentator for Huskies Hockey. In addition to covering games, Mix93 also airs a program entitled "Huskies Drive Time," a half hour of programming dedicated to Michigan Tech Huskies sports, including game highlights, coach interviews, and discussion.

History
The station was known as "Z93" WZRK with a CHR format throughout the 1980s, and has programmed a variety of formats since, including oldies and contemporary Christian music.

WKMJ, along with its sister station, WMPL-AM, were purchased in 2006 from Victor Broadcasting Corp. by J & J Broadcasting.

Sources
Michiguide.com - WKMJ-FM History

External links

KMJ-FM
Hot adult contemporary radio stations in the United States
Radio stations established in 1998